The Motorola Ming is a series of smartphones from Motorola, sold in Hong Kong and mainland China only. It is one of the series in the 4LTR line.

A1200i

The A1200 came in December 2005. Although initially the A1200i was slightly towards the expensive side, with the advent of the ROKR E6 and other phones, the cost of the A1200i has been considerably reduced.

Technical specifications
 Application CPU: XScale PXA270 processor 315 MHz
 Baseband CPU: Freescale ARM CPU with a Motorola 56000 DSP handling radio traffic
 Talk time: 2–4 hrs
 Standby time: 14–48 hrs
 Browser: native Opera, WAP 2.0, WML, xHTML, HTML, JavaScript, simple Ajax
 Messaging: MMS, SMS
 E-mail: POP3, IMAP4, SMTP with SSL-encryption
 Applications: Java ME, M3G (JSR 184), MIDP 2.0; native applications supported with use of special packaging software
 Synchronization: SyncML, OTA
 Security: Voice Print, OMA DRM 1.0
 Music: MIDI (40), MP3, WAV, AMR, WMA, aacplus
Upgrading latest firmware, it supports the EDGE network. The latest version of Ming already supports EDGE.

Other features
 Integrated stereo FM tuner (use of wired headset required)
 Document viewer (PDF, Word, Excel, PowerPoint)
 High performance personal information manager
 Hands-free speaker phone with 40 channel polyphonic speaker
 Speaker independent voice dial
 Cursive handwriting recognition
 Bluetooth wireless technology with support for these profiles: HSP, HFP, GOEP, A2DP, AVRCP, BIP, BPP, and DUN

A1200e
 Operating system: Motorola EZX Linux
 Browser: native Opera 8.00 for EZX
 User guide

A1600

The A1600 first appeared in June 2008.

Overview
MotoMing A1600, offers access to email, messaging and browsing in a user-friendly and stylish design. The full touchscreen simulates a traditional keypad, to give users a familiar experience, while a simplified user interface offers one-handed access to the most often used applications. Bluetooth 2.0 allows for simple pairing with enabled accessories, and enhances A1600's download speed and improving battery life.

Technical specifications
 Application CPU: Intel XScale PXA270 processor
 Talk time: 2–4 hrs
 Standby time: 14–48 hrs
 Browser: native Opera, WAP 2.0, WML, xHTML, HTML, JavaScript, simple Ajax
 Messaging: MMS, SMS
 E-mail: POP3, IMAP4, SMTP with SSL-encryption
 Applications: Java ME, M3G (JSR-184), MIDP 2.0
 Synchronization: SyncML, OTA
 Security: voice print, OMA DRM 1.0
 Music: MIDI (40), MP3, WAV, AMR, WMA, aacplus

Other features
 aGPS support for turn-by-turn navigation
 3.2 MP with autofocus, scan ability, panorama, GIF animation for MMS
 Camera scanner with talking dictionary and business card reader
 Fuzzy Pinyin handwriting recognition
 Integrated stereo FM tuner (use of wired headset required)
 Document viewer (PDF, Word, Excel, PowerPoint)
 High performance personal information manager
 Hands-free speaker phone with 40 channel polyphonic speaker
 Speaker independent voice dial
 Cursive handwriting recognition
 Bluetooth wireless technology with support for these profiles: HSP, HFP, GOEP, A2DP, AVRCP, BIP, BPP, and DUN

A1800

The 1800 came in May 2009, and featured a 3.15 MP camera.

A1680

The A1680 arrived in Q3 2010. It was given major improvements, including a better camera, a larger screen with better pixels, higher memory card limit and came installed with the Android 1.6 Donut operating system (OS).

External links
 
 English User Manual Download
 A1200 article on the OpenEZX wiki

Motorola smartphones
Mobile phones introduced in 2006